Carlina Durán Baldera (born January 17, 1987 in Concepción de La Vega) is a Dominican model who won the national crown of Miss Dominican Republic 2012, initially giving her the right to compete in Miss Universe 2012 representing her country in December 2012. After representing her home province of La Vega in the 2012 Miss Dominican Republic, Carola was crowned by Miss Dominican Republic 2011 Dalia Fernandez. She later got dethroned for admitting she had been married in 2009.

Biography

Durán was a culinary student in the city of Santiago de los Caballeros, where she graduated at Pontificia Universidad Católica Madre y Maestra. She first started modeling at the age of 15. Her first pageant was Miss World La Vega, and was able to compete in the Reina Nacional de la Belleza República Dominicana 2011, in which she placed as first runner up. Being a finalist in the contest RNB allowed her to enter Miss Tourism Queen International where she did not place.

Miss Dominican Republic 2012

Durán competed as a representative of the province of La Vega, being one of 37 candidates in the country of Dominican Republic in the national beauty contest, Miss Dominican Republic 2012, broadcast live from Santo Domingo on April 17, 2012, where she was crowned the winner, earning the right to represent the Dominican Republic in Miss Universe 2012.

The first runner-up is Dulcita Lieggi from the Distrito Nacional, who was to represent the Dominican Republic in the contest of Miss Continente Americano 2012 in Ecuador. The second runner-up, Carolyn Hawa from Santiago, will represent the Dominican Republic in the contest of Reina Hispanoamericana 2012 in Bolivia. The third runner-up was Alondra Peña of Peravia and the fourth runner-up was Luz Quezada of San José de Ocoa.

On April 24, 2012, exactly one week after she won the crown, Carola was dethroned due to the fact that she was once married according to the MDR organization.

Nuestra Belleza Latina 2013
On February 4, 2013 Carlina auditioned for the beauty pageant/reality show Nuestra Belleza Latina 2013 in Miami, FL. She was selected by judge Osmel Souza to be in his group and be part of the Top 30 girls. On March 24, 2013 after weeks of competition she advanced to the Top 18. However, the following week on March 31, 2013 she didn't receive enough votes from the viewers and was eliminated from the competition.

External links

 Bio, Facts and pictures of Carola Durán
 Official Miss Dominican Republic website

1987 births
Living people
People from La Vega Province
Miss Dominican Republic